The Bugle Sounds is a 1942 American World War II movie starring Wallace Beery as a cavalry sergeant resistant to replacing horses with tanks. The supporting cast includes Marjorie Main, Lewis Stone, George Bancroft, Donna Reed, and Chill Wills, and  the film was directed by S. Sylvan Simon.

Plot
In 1941, Colonel Lawton of the 19th Cavalry Regiment has to convert his unit from horses to light tanks. First Sergeant Patrick Aloysius 'Hap' Doan who has nearly 30 years in the US Cavalry with service in the Mexican Border Campaign and World War I has a hard time with the adjustments. The regiment is also to take in its first draftees.  In the meantime saboteurs are attempting to destroy the tanks.

Cast

See also
 List of American films of 1942

The other six Wallace Beery and Marjorie Main films:
 Wyoming (1940)
 Barnacle Bill (1941)
 Jackass Mail (1942)
 Rationing (1944)
 Bad Bascomb (1946)
 Big Jack (1949)

References

External links
 
 
 
 

1942 films
1940s war films
American black-and-white films
1940s English-language films
World War II films made in wartime
Films directed by S. Sylvan Simon
Films scored by Lennie Hayton
Metro-Goldwyn-Mayer films
American war films